Nijat Mammadov may refer to:
 Nidjat Mamedov, Azerbaijani chess player
 Nijat Mammadov (footballer), Azerbaijani footballer